Allium angulosum, the mouse garlic, is a species of garlic native to a wide region of central Europe and northern Asia, from France and Italy to Siberia and Kazakhstan.

Allium angulosum is a perennial herb up to 50 cm tall. Bulbs are narrow and elongated, about 5 mm in diameter. The plant produces a hemispherical umbel of small pink flowers on long pedicels.

Uses
Allium angulosum is cultivated as an ornamental and also as an herb for kitchen gardens. Bulbs and leaves are edible cooked or in salads. There are, however, some reports of being toxic in large quantities.

References

angulosum
Garlic
Flora of Europe
Flora of temperate Asia
Edible plants
Garden plants
Plants described in 1753
Taxa named by Carl Linnaeus